Nuala Ní Chonchúir (born 14 January 1970) is an Irish writer and poet.

Biography

Born in Dublin in 1970, Nuala Ní Chonchúir is a full-time fiction writer and poet, living in County Galway. She holds a BA in Irish from Trinity College Dublin and a Masters in Translation Studies (Irish/English) from Dublin City University. She has worked as an arts administrator in theatre and in a writers' centre; as a translator, as a bookseller and also in a university library. Nuala teaches creative writing on a part-time basis.

Ní Chonchúir was featured in The Irish Times "People to watch in the year ahead" on Saturday 3 January 2009.

Works
Ní Chonchúir has published five novels, four collections of short fiction and three poetry collections - one in an anthology. Her short story "The Wind Across the Grass" (the title story from her 2004 collection) won the RTÉ Francis MacManus Award in 2002. She was writer in residence for the 2009 Cúirt International Festival of Literature.

Her third short story collection, Nude, was published in Autumn 2009 by Salt Publishing.

In November 2009 her poetry pamphlet Portrait of the Artist With a Red Car was published by Templar Poetry.

2010 saw the publication of her first novel - You was published in April by New island books.

Her poetry collection The Juno Charm was published by Salmon Poetry in November 2011.

Her fourth short story collection, Mother America, was published in June 2012 by New island books. The story "Peach", from the collection, was published in Prairie Schooners Winter 2011 issue and was nominated for the 2012 Pushcart Prize.

She has also written an essay for the Wales Arts Review's Bloomsday edition.

In September 2013 Tower Press (USA) published Of Dublin and Other Fictions, a chapbook collection of Nuala's flash fiction.

Her second novel, Closet of Savage Mementos, published by New island books in April 2014, was shortlisted for The Kerry Group Irish Novel of the Year Award 2015.

In October 2014 she was nominated for the Laureate for Irish Fiction.

Nuala's third novel, Miss Emily, was published by Penguin USA and Penguin Canada in July 2015, and by Sandstone Press in August of the same year. This was her first novel as Nuala O'Connor.

Miss Emily was shortlisted for the Eason Book Club novel of the Year 2015 and was nominated for the 2017 Dublin International Literary Award.

Review quotations

"...The novel flows beautifully and is understated in tone... This gem is sure to win her further acclaim. Nuala Ní Chonchúir is a writer to watch."

"… one of Ireland's most unusual and creative minds; [her fiction is] dressed in modernity, a ritual playing of the bones of Irish storytelling."

"Look for some big things to come from Galway's Ní Chonchúir. She has such a diversity of work and can say so much in just a few words that it's obvious she's also an award-winning poet. Her stories are filled with very astute observations, some humorous, some sad."

"...Nude, with its thematic discipline, is a memorable achievement.  As with Brendan Kennelly’s ground-breaking collection of poetry, Cromwell, it is satisfying to sit down with a book that sets itself an explorative, self-questioning agenda, full of witty voices rendering adventures both savage and absurd." The Irish Times

"...You deserves to find a place in our pantheon of much-admired, beautifully crafted variations on a theme" The Irish Times

"...[You] flows beautifully and is understated in tone. The author, who lives in Co Galway, has already won prizes for her poetry and short stories. This gem is sure to win her further acclaim. Nuala Ní Chonchúir is a writer to watch." Irish Examiner

Bibliography

Novel

Short story collections

Poetry collections

References

External links
Nuala Ní Chonchúir's Homepage
Salt Publishing Author Page
New Island Author Page
Salmon Poetry Collection Page
Tower Press Home page
Penguin Books Author Page
Sandstone Press Author Page

Irish women short story writers
21st-century Irish short story writers
Writers from Dublin (city)
People from County Galway
1970 births
21st-century Irish poets
21st-century Irish novelists
Living people
Irish women poets
Irish women novelists